The Kazbeg birch mouse (Sicista kazbegica) is a species of rodent in the family Sminthidae. It is found in Georgia and Russia and has a natural habitat of temperate forests.

References

External links 

Sicista
Taxonomy articles created by Polbot
Mammals described in 1986